Tritenii de Jos is a commune in Cluj County, Transylvania, Romania. It is composed of six villages: Clapa (Szentkirályi tanya), Colonia (Detrehemtelep), Pădurenii (Țigăreni until 1964, also formerly called Coc; Mezőkók), Tritenii de Jos, Tritenii de Sus (Felsődetrehem) and Tritenii-Hotar (Irisorai tanyák).

Demographics 
According to the census from 2002 there was a total population of 5,066 people living in this commune. Of this population, 90.99% were ethnic Romanians, 8.23% were ethnic Hungarians and 0.75% ethnic Romani.

Natives
Pavel Dan, prose writer
Emil Hațieganu, politician and jurist
Gheorghe Mureșan, former NBA basketball player

References

Atlasul localităților județului Cluj (Cluj County Localities Atlas), Suncart Publishing House, Cluj-Napoca, 

Communes in Cluj County
Localities in Transylvania